Men's ice hockey tournaments have been staged at the Olympic Games since 1920. The men's tournament was introduced at the 1920 Summer Olympics, and permanently added to the Winter Olympic Games in 1924. Ukraine has participated in one tournament, the 2002 Winter Olympics, sending 3 goaltenders and 20 skaters. They played three preliminary-round games and one classification game, finishing tenth of the fourteen nations competing. Prior to 1991, Ukraine participated as a member of the Soviet Union, competing in every Winter Olympics from 1952 until 1992 (the country competed as part of the Unified Team in 1992).

Four players – Igor Chybirev, Valentyn Oletsky, Dmytro Khristich, and Vadym Shakhraychuk – tied for the most goals, two, while Roman Salnikov had the most assists, three. Chybirev, Oletsky, and Salnikov had the most points, three.

Goaltenders

Skaters

Notes

References
 
 
 
 
 
 

ice hockey
Ukraine
Ukraine

Ukraine men's national ice hockey team